Pieter Brueghel may refer to:

 Pieter Brueghel the Elder ( 1525–1569), Dutch and Flemish Renaissance painter
 Pieter Brueghel the Younger (1564–1638), son of the above, Flemish painter and copyist, also known as "Hell Brueghel"